Leucophlebia lineata, the large candy-striped hawkmoth, is a moth of the family Sphingidae. It was described by John O. Westwood in 1847. It is known from Sri Lanka, India, Nepal, Thailand, eastern and southern China, Taiwan, Cambodia, Vietnam, Malaysia (Peninsular, Sarawak), Indonesia (Sumatra, Java, Kalimantan, Flores, Sulawesi) and the Philippines. It is a minor pest of sugarcane.

Description
The wingspan is 62–82 mm. The forewing upperside is similar to other Leucophlebia species in having broad pinkish costal and outer marginal areas and a paler median band, but differs in having the hind margin paler, nearer the colour of the median band, and with some picked out in white. The larvae feed on coarse grasses of the family Poaceae.

In The Fauna of British India, Including Ceylon and Burma: Moths Volume I, the species is described as follows:

References

Leucophlebia
Moths described in 1847